A , also called , is a frame used for making , a type of Japanese braid. The threads are attached to weighted bobbins called tamas and lay on wood pieces with pegs that are called koma. A wooden sword is used to lightly beat the braid once the braiding has been done. The braiding progresses on a 'V' front, as opposed to weaving on a regular loom that progresses on a straight front. 

The art that is worked on the takadai is a braid, not a weave.  Although many of the patterns used on this braiding stand resemble the up and down motion of a weave, since each thread takes a turn at being both the weft and the warp, it is a braid.

On the takadai it is possible to make intricate patterns using a technique called "pick-up braids". The braid has two sides of two contrasting colors and is usually linked on the edges. Then a pattern is formed by interchanging strands from the bottom braid to the upper braid, and by changing the braiding sequence.

Related terms
Kumihimo 組紐 - "kumi" from the Japanese verb, "kumu," meaning "to braid." "Himo" means "cord" or "string." May be written as くみひも、組紐、組み紐。
Marudai- 丸台 - a wooden braiding stand with a circular top (kagami) pierced with a center hole. It is used to make a variety of braids, including round, square, rectangular, flat, triangular, and other polygonal shapes well. 
Obi - 帯 - a sash of varying widths, used to secure a kimono.
Obijime - 帯締め - the cord used to secure the obi.
Tama - 玉 - weighted wooden bobbins used in all types of kumihomo except Karakumi. The weight provides tension on the threads; this is countered by another weight suspended from the braid underneath the kagami

References

Books
 Making Kumihimo, Japanese interlaced braids, by Rodrick Owen
 Comprehensive Treatrise of Braids V, Taka-dai braids 3, by Makiko Tada

Braids